Humaira Ali (née Chaudhry) is a Pakistani actress. She is known for her roles in dramas Nail Polish, Kankar, Jab We Wed and Sammi.

Early life
Humaira was born on April 5th in 1960 in Lahore, Pakistan. She completed her studies from University of Lahore.

Career
Ali joined the television industry in 1973. She made her debut as an actress on PTV's drama serial Jhok Siyal which was successful; she played a lead role along with Abid Ali. Since then she appeared in dramas Akbari Asghari, Sabz Pari Laal Kabootar, Nail Polish, Kankar, Jab We Wed, Ranjish Hi Sahi and Sammi. Humaira also sang songs in Jhok Sial and she also sang in dramas directed by her husband Abid. She was known for singing in drama Dasht and Doosra Aasman which was also directed by her husband.

Personal life
Humaira married Abid Ali in 1976. They met during the shooting of drama Johak Sial. She has three daughters: super-model-turned-actress Iman Ali, singer and actress Rahma Ali, and Maryam Ali. She and Abid Ali divorced in 2006, she still uses his last name and remained on good terms with him. Humaira's sister Shama is also an actress.

Filmography

Television

Telefilm

Film

References

External links
 

1960 births
Living people
20th-century Pakistani women singers
20th-century Pakistani actresses
Pakistani television actresses
Urdu-language singers
21st-century Pakistani actresses
Pakistani film actresses
21st-century Pakistani women singers
Punjabi-language singers
Pakistani women singers